Laurens Johannes Bol (23 January 1898, in Ooltgensplaat – 11 April 1994, in Dordrecht) was an art historian who specialized in 17th-century Dutch Golden Age painters.

Biography
He was a teacher in Goeree-Overflakkee. He later moved to Middelburg in 1920, where he started researching artists in the local archives. In 1927 he married the painter Elizabeth Smit (1898-1994). He became an expert on Dutch masters from Middelburg and is credited with the "discovery" of Adriaen Coorte. Thanks to his work in Middelburg, valuable material was rescued for later generations. The Middelburg archives went up in flames during World War II. The research that Bol did on Coorte, Ambrosius Bosschaert, Balthasar van der Ast and Jacob van Geel (ca. 1585–1638), saved them from obscurity.

He became a regular visitor of the Rijksbureau voor Kunsthistorische Documentatie, and was particularly interested in less popular Dutch masters. He wrote his first article in Oud Holland in 1949. In his thirty years as a resident of Middelburg, he wrote regularly for the  NRC and Openbaar Kunstbezit. He published books on lesser-known artists.

Between 1949–1965 Laurence Bol was director of the Dordrechts Museum. Although the museum had very little funding Bol made some exquisite exhibitions in his time. The museum became known for its collection of less well known artists.

Bibliography
 The Bosschaert dynasty: Painters of flowers and fruit, F.Lewis, 1960
 Jan van Eyck (Art series; no.23), Blandford P, 1965
 Die holländische Marinemalerei des 17. Jahrhunderts., Braunschweig, 1973

References

 Overview of publications
 Bol in the personen encyclopedia
 Books by Bol on Google books
 

1898 births
1994 deaths
Dutch art historians
People from Middelburg, Zeeland
People from Oostflakkee
Directors of museums in the Netherlands